Sun Zhiqiang (born 1944) a lieutenant general in the People's Liberation Army of China. He was a delegate to the 9th National People's Congress and a member of the 16th Central Committee of the Chinese Communist Party. He was a member of the Standing Committee of the 11th Chinese People's Political Consultative Conference.

Biography
Sun was born in Rushan County (now Rushan), Shandong, in 1944. In 1964, he was accepted to Central University of Finance and Economics, majoring in finance. After graduation in 1968, he became a sent-down youth in a farm. 

He enlisted in the People's Liberation Army (PLA) in April 1970, and joined the Chinese Communist Party (CCP) in December 1976. From 1972 to 1985, he served in the Logistics Department of Kunming Military District. In July 1985, he became deputy head of the Finance Division of the People's Liberation Army General Logistics Department, rising to head in November 1991. He was promoted to deputy head of the People's Liberation Army General Logistics Department, and served until December 2007.

He was promoted to the rank of major general (shaojiang) in June 1991 and lieutenant general (zhongjiang) in July 2001.

References

1944 births
Living people
People from Weihai
Central University of Finance and Economics alumni
People's Liberation Army generals from Shandong
People's Republic of China politicians from Shandong
Chinese Communist Party politicians from Shandong
Delegates to the 9th National People's Congress
Members of the 16th Central Committee of the Chinese Communist Party
Members of the Standing Committee of the 11th Chinese People's Political Consultative Conference